The Kondor was a German automobile manufactured from 1902 until 1904.  The 5 hp two-seater was the product of a bicycle works.

References

Defunct motor vehicle manufacturers of Germany